Dale Dickson (born 3 July 1962) is a former Australian rules footballer who played with Melbourne and the Brisbane Bears in the Victorian Football League (VFL) during the 1980s.

He has been the Chief Executive Officer of Australia’s second largest local government, the City of Gold Coast, since July 2003.  He is also a former Chief Executive Officer of the Whitsunday Shire Council.

References

1962 births
Australian rules footballers from Victoria (Australia)
Melbourne Football Club players
Brisbane Bears players
Shepparton Football Club players
Australian chief executives
Living people